Cherry Valley Archeological Site, RI-279 is an archaeological site in Glocester, Rhode Island

The site contains various archaeological evidence from the pre-historic era.  The site was added to the National Register of Historic Places on November 1, 1984.

See also
National Register of Historic Places listings in Providence County, Rhode Island

References

Archaeological sites on the National Register of Historic Places in Rhode Island
Glocester, Rhode Island
National Register of Historic Places in Providence County, Rhode Island